Cutler and Gross is a British luxury eyewear brand, founded by Graham Cutler and Tony Gross in 1969. It is based in the Knightsbridge area of London.

History
The brand was started in London in 1969 by partners Graham Cutler and Tony Gross, who first met at Northampton College while studying optometry in the early 1960s. They opened their first optician's office in Knightsbridge in 1971, stocking handmade bespoke frames, and soon won recognition for pioneering the concept of fashion eyewear.

Their collection has developed from only sunglasses, now incorporating optical designs for prescription lenses. Marie Wilkinson, who has worked at Cutler and Gross since 1982, is now the head of design.

Famous fans of the brand have included Madonna, Rihanna, Lady Gaga, Kate Moss and Manolo Blahnik.

Boutiques
As well as their flagship boutique in London's Knightsbridge district, Cutler and Gross has a 'vintage' shop in Knightsbridge, which was named amongst "The 100 Best Shops in London" by Time Out London and a store in Spitalfields, East London. Outside of the capital, the brand has only one other shop in the city of Bath, England.

Internationally, Cutler and Gross have bespoke boutiques in the SoHo district of New York City, West Hollywood, and Toronto.

The Cutler and Gross Museum
In August 2011, Cutler and Gross launched their museum spanning the top floor of their Knightsbridge store. The floor has a permanent display of more than four thousand frames that date back to 1969. Also on the top floor is the bespoke service mirrored room, where the clients can create their own glasses or choose a bespoke service and have a pair designed for them.

Fashion
Cutler and Gross eyewear is designed at the Cutler and Gross headquarters in Marylebone, London, and is handmade in a factory in Domegge di Cadore, Italy.

The company's eyewear has been worn on catwalks and in magazines, including Vogue, Glamour, Elle, Grazia, Marie Claire, Dazed & Confused, GQ, Vanity Fair, Esquire, The Financial Times, and Forbes.

Film and television
The firm has exploited product placement loans to secure brand awareness in films and television, notably actor Joe Cole's portrayal of Harry Palmer in the 2022 Ipcress File remake for Netflix,  Daniel Craig in Knives Out 2,  Colin Firth & Samuel L. Jackson in Kingsman: The Secret Service, Julia Roberts in Notting Hill and Michael Fassbender in  The Counsellor.

Projects
In 2008 Cutler and Gross showed their new and past collections at Selfridges London. In 2009, Cutler and Gross was presented with the award for Best Accessory, by HRH Princess Royal at the UK Fashion Export Awards. In 2010, Cutler and Gross eyewear was on the front cover of Graham Pullin's book Design Meets Disability. The book was dedicated to Graham Cutler and Tony Gross. 2011 marked the launch of their bi-annual magazine.

On the catwalk
Cutler and Gross eyewear has been an accessory in catwalk collections for many designers over the past few decades. Some recent collaborations include:
2009: Cutler and Gross eyewear features on the catwalks of Erdem, Giles Deacon, Jasmine de Milo, Twenty8Twelve, Jenny Packham, Richard Nichol and Osman Yousefzada.
2010 A/W Fashion Weeks: Their eyewear featured on the catwalks of Daks, Osman Yousefzada and b Store.
2011 S/S Fashion Weeks: At Paris Fashion Week, they feature the catwalks of Emanuel Ungaro, Cacharel and Maison Martin Margiela. In London Fashion Week, Cutler and Gross feature in the catwalk shows of Holly Fulton, Richard Nicoll and Twenty8Twelve. Additionally, in New York Fashion Week, Cutler and Gross made an appearance on the catwalk of Tim Hamilton.
2011 A/W Fashion Weeks: In London Fashion Week, Cutler and Gross featured on the catwalks of Holly Fulton and Meadham Kirchhoff. During New York Fashion Week, Cutler and Gross appeared on the catwalk show of Timo Weiland.

Collaborations
Cutler and Gross has collaborated with a range of fashion labels to create limited edition frames over the years. Recent collaborations include:

Erdem: In 2009 Cutler and Gross collaborated with Canadian designer Erdem (2005 Fashion Fringe winner) to create a collection of sunglasses for the Spring/Summer 2010 collection. The collection was inspired by an image of a Japanese fisherwoman dressed in brightly printed shorts charging out from the waves across black sand. The glasses are a juxtaposition of vibrant colour pops with darker backgrounds on a 1960s style round frame. The sunglasses were created in black, black lace, tortoise, neutral stone and Erdem's customised Kyoto print.
Maison Martin Margiela: In 2010 Cutler and Gross teamed up with avant-garde French fashion label Maison Martin Margiela. The collection of sunglasses featured two lines, 'Wrong Size' and 'Anatomic', both appearing in acetate and metal varieties. The 'Wrong Size' line consists of classic Cutler and Gross aviator-style frames which are deconstructed then reconstructed with ill-fitting lenses creating a unique range of sunglasses. The 'Anatomic' line consisted of large futuristic, wraparounds sunglasses that are designed wrap around the wearer in a custom fit.
Giles Deacon: In 2010 Cutler and Gross collaborated with Giles Deacon to create a range of retro inspired 'Cats Eye' sunglasses. Mirrored lenses added a modern twist to the retro style.
Comme Des Garcons: 2009 saw the second collaboration of Cutler and Gross with Comme Des Garcons. The 'Future of Black' limited edition collection consisted of three designs, all fitted with extra dark grey tinted lenses to create a totally black look. The glasses came inside a unique glasses case covered in Comme des Garcons's own fabric.
Mulberry: In 2008, Cutler and Gross collaborated with British accessories giant Mulberry. The collection showcased a small history from the archives of Cutler and Gross, dating back from the bold block colours of the early 1980s to rock & roll style of the 1990s.
Thomas Tait.
Alberta Ferretti.
Martyn Bal.
Victoria Beckham: Cutler and Gross works with the celebrity designer to create an eyewear line under her own moniker.
Kingsman: The Secret Service.

References

External links
Cutler and Gross official web site

Eyewear brands of the United Kingdom
British brands
High fashion brands
English fashion designers
Manufacturing companies established in 1969
1969 establishments in England
1970s fashion
1980s fashion
1990s fashion
2000s fashion
2010s fashion
Eyewear companies of the United Kingdom